is a Japanese professional golfer.

Hiratsuka was born in Kyoto, Japan. He has won six times on the Japan Golf Tour. He represented Japan at the 2007 Omega Mission Hills World Cup with Hideto Tanihara.

Professional wins (9)

Japan Golf Tour wins (6)

1Co-sanctioned by the Asian Tour

Asian Tour wins (4)

1Co-sanctioned by the Japan Golf Tour

Asian Tour playoff record (1–0)

Results in major championships

CUT = missed the half-way cut
"T" = tied
Note: Hiratsuka never played in the Masters Tournament or the U.S. Open.

Results in World Golf Championships

"T" = Tied
Note that the HSBC Champions did not become a WGC event until 2009.

Team appearances
Dynasty Cup (representing Japan): 2005
World Cup (representing Japan): 2006, 2007, 2011
Royal Trophy (representing Asia): 2007

References

External links

Japanese male golfers
Japan Golf Tour golfers
Asian Tour golfers
Sportspeople from Kyoto Prefecture
1971 births
Living people